Middlebush is an unincorporated community and census-designated place (CDP) located in Franklin Township, in Somerset County, New Jersey, United States. As of the 2010 United States Census, the CDP's population was 2,326. It is perhaps most distinguished as being the host section for Franklin Township's municipal complex.

Middlebush still has a rural feel with 19th-century homes and tree-lined streets.  Middlebush was once a stop on the Millstone and New Brunswick Railroad, and this legacy is evident in the street named Railroad Avenue that presently has no railroad tracks in sight.

Geography
According to the United States Census Bureau, Middlebush had a total area of 1.990 square miles (5.155 km2), including 1.989 square miles (5.151 km2) of land and 0.001 square miles (0.004 km2) of water (0.07%).

Demographics

Census 2010

Points of interest
 Middlebush Reformed Church
 Middlebush Park is Franklin Township's newest municipal park.  Located in Middlebush, off DeMott Lane, the park hosts ballfields and a children's playground.
 Stage House Tavern was Colonial Farms, which now houses the restaurant.
 Middlebush Giant was a circus performer and sideshow attraction who  retired to a farm in Middlebush.
 Cedar Grove Cemetery, Franklin is located off Amwell Avenue and contains the body of the Middlebush Giant.
 Middlebush Volunteer Fire Department

Historic district
The Middlebush Village Historic District was added to the National Register of Historic Places on April 24, 2007.

References

Census-designated places in Somerset County, New Jersey
Franklin Township, Somerset County, New Jersey